Cursed is an original novel based on the  television series Buffy the Vampire Slayer and its spin-off Angel.

Plot summary

Various demons have battled Spike since he was given a chip preventing him from hurting humans. Now a more organised and united effort is being made to put him out of the picture.

In Los Angeles, Angel is searching for a mystical object that is linked to his days as the evil Angelus. Spike arrives. Each holds a grudge against each other yet they must reluctantly work together and deal with their shared evil pasts.

Continuity

Supposed to be set early in sixth season of Buffy the Vampire Slayer, and Angel third season, the story remains outside Buffyverse canon, and written long before Angel season 5 which would come to contradict certain continuity points.

Canonical issues

Buffy/Angel books such as this one are not usually considered by fans as canonical. Some fans consider them stories from the imaginations of authors and artists, while other fans consider them as taking place in an alternative fictional reality. However unlike fan fiction, overviews summarising their story, written early in the writing process, were 'approved' by both Fox and Joss Whedon (or his office), and the books were therefore later published as official Buffy/Angel merchandise.  Although, the permanence of such officiality is understandably suspect, given the ret-con the Star Wars Expanded Universe underwent, following the purchase of licensing rights by Marvel/Disney.

External links

Reviews
Litefoot1969.bravepages.com - Review of this book by Litefoot
Teen-books.com - Reviews of this book

2003 fantasy novels
Books based on Buffy the Vampire Slayer
Angel (1999 TV series) novels
Pocket Books books